NCAA Football 2002 is a video game of the sports genre released in 2001 by EA Tiburon. The cover athlete is the 2001 Heisman winning Florida State quarterback Chris Weinke. The game featured all (as of 2001) Division 1-A schools along with all SWAC, MEAC, and Ivy League schools. This game notably did not have a Create-a-School option, and is the only game to feature the EA Sports fight song as the main menu music.

Reception

The game received "universal acclaim" according to the review aggregation website Metacritic. Jim Preston of NextGen said that the game was "Undoubtedly the best college football game available for any system." Playboy gave it universal acclaim, a few weeks before the game was released.

References

External links
Official website

2001 video games
College football video games
Electronic Arts games
NCAA video games
North America-exclusive video games
PlayStation 2 games
PlayStation 2-only games
Video games developed in the United States
Video games set in 2002